William Alexander McWhorter (December 7, 1918 – December 5, 1944) was a United States Army soldier and a recipient of the United States military's highest decoration—the Medal of Honor—for his actions in World War II.

Biography
McWhorter joined the Army from his birthplace of Liberty, South Carolina, and by December 5, 1944, was serving as a private first class in Company M, 126th Infantry Regiment, 32nd Infantry Division. On that day, at Leyte in the Philippines, he smothered the blast of an enemy-thrown explosive with his body, sacrificing himself to protect the man next to him. For this action, he was posthumously awarded the Medal of Honor nine months later, on September 27, 1945.

McWhorter, aged 25 at his death, was buried in West View Cemetery, Liberty, South Carolina.

Medal of Honor citation
Private First Class McWhorter's official Medal of Honor citation reads:
He displayed gallantry and intrepidity at the risk of his life above and beyond the call of duty while engaged in operations against the enemy. Pfc. McWhorter, a machine gunner, was emplaced in a defensive position with 1 assistant when the enemy launched a heavy attack. Manning the gun and opening fire, he killed several members of an advancing demolition squad, when 1 of the enemy succeeded in throwing a fused demolition charge in the entrenchment. Without hesitation and with complete disregard for his own safety, Pfc. McWhorter picked up the improvised grenade and deliberately held it close to his body, bending over and turning away from his companion. The charge exploded, killing him instantly, but leaving his assistant unharmed. Pfc. McWhorter's outstanding heroism and supreme sacrifice in shielding a comrade reflect the highest traditions of the military service.

See also

List of Medal of Honor recipients

References

1918 births
1944 deaths
United States Army personnel killed in World War II
United States Army Medal of Honor recipients
People from Pickens County, South Carolina
United States Army soldiers
World War II recipients of the Medal of Honor